Rihpovec is a dispersed settlement in the hills east of Trebnje in eastern Slovenia. The area is part of the historical region of Lower Carniola and is included in the Southeast Slovenia Statistical Region.

References

External links
Rihpovec at Geopedia

Populated places in the Municipality of Trebnje